Alysse (formerly HMS Alyssum) was one of the nine s lent by the Royal Navy to the Free French Naval Forces.

Construction
Alysse was built by George Brown & Co.

War service
Originally built as HMS Alyssum by the British Royal Navy, she was loaned to the Free French Navy upon completion on 17 June 1941.

The torpedo struck Alysse on the port side in the forward part of the ship causing her to settle by the bow. Hepatica then attempted to tow Alysse but after 30 minutes the tow parted. A further attempt was made to tow her to port later that day but after 18 hours Alysse foundered and sank at 6°34N/44°10W.

References

 

1941 ships
Flower-class corvettes of the Free French Naval Forces
Ships sunk by German submarines in World War II
World War II shipwrecks in the Atlantic Ocean